EPL is a peer-reviewed scientific journal published by EDP Sciences, IOP Publishing and the Italian Physical Society on behalf of the European Physical Society and 17 other European physical societies. Prior to 1 January 2007 it was known as Europhysics Letters.

Scope 
EPL publishes original letters that communicates new results and findings that merit rapid publication in all areas of physics. EPL also publishes comments on letters previously published in the journal.

History 
Europhysics Letters  was founded in 1986 by the European Physical Society (EPS), Société Française de Physique (SFP) and its subsidiary EDP Sciences, the Società Italiana di Fisica (SIF) and the Institute of Physics (IOP). The new journal incorporated Lettere al Nuovo Cimento and Journal de Physique: Lettres and was published by EPS, EDP Sciences and SIF until 2006.

EPL is now published under the scientific policy and control of the EPS by EDP Sciences, IOP Publishing and SIF for a partnership of 17 European physical societies (the EPL Association).

Abstracting, indexing, and impact factor 
According to the Journal Citation Reports, the journal had a 2022 impact factor of 1.958.

It is indexed in the following bibliographic databases:
Aerospace & High Technology
Chemical Abstracts
Environmental Science and Pollution Management
GeoRef
INIS
Inspec
Astrophysics Data System
Scopus
SPIRES
Web of Science

External links

References 

Physics journals
English-language journals
Biweekly journals
Publications established in 1986
EDP Sciences academic journals
IOP Publishing academic journals
Italian Physical Society academic journals
European Physical Society